Chrigor Flores Moraes (born 13 November 2000), simply known as Chrigor, is a Brazilian footballer who plays as a forward for Inter de Limeira, on loan from Red Bull Bragantino.

Career statistics

Club

References

2000 births
Living people
Brazilian footballers
Association football forwards
Campeonato Brasileiro Série A players
Grêmio Esportivo Brasil players
Red Bull Brasil players
Red Bull Bragantino players
América Futebol Clube (MG) players
Grêmio Novorizontino players